Burning Bridges is the debut studio album by English new wave band Naked Eyes, released on 16 March 1983 by EMI and EMI America Records. The album was released in the United States and Canada as Naked Eyes with two tracks demoted to B-sides. The track "Always Something There to Remind Me" was released as a single and reached No. 59 on the UK Singles Chart and US #8 in July 1983 before "Promises, Promises" reached US #11 and "When The Lights Go Out" US #37. The album was released for the first time on CD in 2012 by Cherry Red Records.

Track listing

US release
The North American release of Burning Bridges was issued in April 1983, retitled as Naked Eyes and released with an alternate cover.

The two deleted songs, "The Time Is Now" and "A Very Hard Act to Follow" were issued in the US as the B-sides of "Always Something There to Remind Me" and "Promises, Promises."

Charts

Personnel 

Naked Eyes
 Pete Byrne – vocals
 Rob Fisher – keyboards (Fairlight CMI, Synclavier 2, PPG Wave 2.2, E-mu Emulator, Oberheim OB-Xa, Prophet-5), grand piano, harpsichord

Additional musicians
 Tony Mansfield – guitars, bass guitar, Simmons drums, Linn LM-1 programming
 Phil Towner – drums
 C. C. Smith – horns
 Martin Dobson – saxophone, flute

Tony Mansfield is listed as having played "guitar" (but not "bass guitar") on the British version of the album (Burning Bridges), while on the American version (self-titled), he is listed as playing "bass guitar" (but not "guitar"). It thus seems reasonable to assume that he played both instruments on the album.

Production 
 Tony Mansfield – producer 
 Hadyn Bendall – engineer 
 Jules Bowen – engineer 
 Bill Smith – art direction, design
 Andrew Douglas – photography

References

Naked Eyes albums
1983 debut albums
EMI Records albums
EMI America Records albums
Albums produced by Tony Mansfield